The Church of St Barnabas is a Church of England parish church in Pimlico, London. It is a Grade I listed building. The church is noted for its Anglo-Catholic tradition, and it "was the first church built in England where the ideals and beliefs of what came to be known as Anglo-Catholic movement were embodied in its architecture and liturgy".

History
The church was built in 1847–1850 to designs of Thomas Cundy (junior), assisted by William Butterfield. It was one of the earliest Ritualistic churches, and the first in London in which all pews were free (charging for pews was normal practice at the time). Three paintings in crypt are by Charles Edgar Buckeridge.

In 1958 the church was designated as a Grade I listed building.

Notable clergy
 W. J. E. Bennett, perpetual curate
 Alfred Gurney, vicar
 John Hudson, curate, later Bishop of Carpentaria
 Charles Lowder, curate, founder of the Society of the Holy Cross
 Frederick Ouseley, curate
 Victor Shearburn, curate, later Bishop of Rangoon
 George Ratcliffe Woodward, curate

Gallery

References

External links
 
 A Church Near You entry

1850 establishments in England
1850 in London
19th-century Church of England church buildings
Pimlico, Saint Barnabas
Churches completed in 1850
Pimlico, Saint Barnabas
Pimlico
Thomas Cundy (junior) church buildings